A Lei do Amor (English title: Wounded Past; literal meaning: The Law of Love) is a Brazilian telenovela produced and broadcast by TV Globo. It premiered on 3 October 2016, replacing Velho Chico, and ended on 31 March 2017, being replaced by A Força do Querer.

Created by Maria Adelaide Amaral and Vincent Villari, the telenovela is directed by Natalia Grimberg and Denise Saraceni.

It features performances by Cláudia Abreu, Reynaldo Gianecchini, Vera Holtz, Grazi Massafera, Tarcísio Meira, José Mayer, Ricardo Tozzi, Thiago Lacerda, Claudia Raia, Isabella Santoni, Humberto Carrão, Alice Wegmann and Heloísa Périssé in the main roles.

The plot features the story of Heloísa and Pedro who after years of separation meet once again and realize the feelings they had for each other, and the efforts of Tião and Magnólia to separate them. It also features politics, power, seduction, comedy, envy, and family drama in the fictitious town of São Dimas where the characters' lives intertwine to create cohesion and conflicts.

Plot 
The story begins in 1995 in a fictitious city of São Dimas, a metropolitan region of São Paulo, which is a typical picture of society and politics. A medium-sized town, that has its main source of income from a weaving factory headed by businessman Fausto (Tarcísio Meira) and his wife Magnólia (Vera Holtz), known to many simply as Mág, whom the city's population has real veneration.

What most people don't know is that Mág, behind the veneer of false tenderness which all tend to view, hides her true nature; she is  arrogant, authoritarian, always thirsty for power and without any scruples. By using various tricks to get what she wants no matter who gets hurt and trying to use these as justification that everything she does is to keep his family together. Fausto married Mág shortly after her first wife's death, who was Pedro's (Chay Suede/Reynaldo Gianecchini) mother. They have to other children Hércules and Vitória.

Pedro meets Heloísa, a young woman who lives a quiet life with her parents; her mother Cândida, who has leukemia, and the unemployed and alcoholic father Jorge. In an act of desperation, her father tries to rob the textile company owned by Fausto but ends up being indicted and arrested; in prison, there is a rebellion and the latter dies. Later, his mother also passes on from her disease for lack of proper treatment.

With Helô and Pedro's relationship, which started prior to the unfortunate events, Mág and Fausto cultivate a plan to separate the two. They hire Gabriela, a new secretary of Mág to seduce and lure Pedro to bed and they also contract Helô to a modeling agency run by Mág's trusted friend and confidante Gigi. In cahoots with Mág, Gigi sends Helô away from São Dimas for a modeling leaving Pedro vulnerable to Suzana. At the same time they cut communication between the two and Pedro felt that Helô had moved on without him. On the night of Helô surprise return, Pedro got drunk and fell a sleep. Mág demands Suzana to seduce Pedro. Helô finds the naked Suzana with Pedro and believes that Pedro betrayed (even though nothing really happened between the two and Pedro never knew about it till years later). During the anger episode Helô leaves São Dimas indefinitely to be a professional model where she meets Tião, a man that she marries and Pedro lives for France due to the pain he felt by Helô's absence.

Years later, Helô has seemingly moved on with her powerful Tião (José Mayer) who are apparently become distant over the years, with their two children; Letícia who suffers the same ailment the grandmother had and Edu who has a difficult relationship with his father. Pedro returns to São Dimas and their romance with Helô is rekindled, once more putting each other to the test as the forces that are set to separate them are more reinforced.

Cast 
 Cláudia Abreu as Heloísa "Helô" Martins Bezerra
 Isabelle Drummond as Young Helô
 Reynaldo Gianecchini as Pedro Guedes Leitão
 Chay Suede as Young Pedro
 Vera Holtz as Magnólia Costa Leitão
 Ana Carolina Godoy as Young Magnólia
 José Mayer as Sebastião "Tião" Bezerra
 Thiago Martins as Young Sebastião
 Isabella Santoni as Letícia Martins Bezerra
 Humberto Carrão as Tiago Leitão
 Alice Wegmann as Isabela Dias
 Tarcísio Meira as Fausto Leitão
 Thiago Lacerda as Ciro Noronha
 Maurício Destri as Young Ciro
 Camila Morgado as Vitória Costa Leitão Noronha
 Sophia Abrahão as Young Vitória
 Grazi Massafera as Luciane Leitão
 Danilo Grangheia as Hércules Costa Leitão
 João Vítor Silva as Young Hércules
 Ricardo Tozzi as Augusto Tavares
 Hugo Bonemer as Young Augusto
 Claudia Raia as Salete
 Daniel Rocha as Gustavo
 Emanuelle Araújo as Yara Garcia
 Bruna Moleiro as Young Yara
 Heloísa Périssé as Mileide Rocha
 Arianne Botelho as Aline Garcia de Oliveira
 Bianca Müller as Ana Luiza Costa Leitão
 Matheus Fagundes as Eduardo "Edu" Martins Bezerra
 Bruna Hamú as Camila Leitão
 Tuca Andrada as Misael de Oliveira
 Acauã Sol as Young Misael
 Otávio Augusto as César Venturini
 Maurício Machado as Arlindo Nacib
 Gil Coelho as Wesley
 Regiane Alves as Beth Tavares
 Ana Rosa as Zuleika "Zuza" Pessoa
 Maria Flor as Flávia
 Danilo Ferreira as Zelito
 Titina Medeiros as Ruty Raquel Rocha
 Armando Babaioff as Bruno Pessoa
 Gabriel Chadan as Robinson
 Érico Brás as Jader Azevedo
 Pierre Baitelli as Antônio Ferrari
 João Campos as Élio Bataglia
 Theo Medon as Young Élio
 Tato Gabus Mendes as Olavo Maciel
 Marcella Rica as Jéssica
 Bia Montez as Leila de Oliveira

Guest stars 
 Regina Duarte as Suzana Rivera
 Gabriela Duarte as Young Suzana
 Denise Fraga as Cândida Martins
 Daniel Ribeiro as Jorge Martins
 Bianca Salgueiro as Carmen da Silva Leitão

Soundtrack

Volume 1 
Cover: Cláudia Abreu, Reynaldo Gianecchini, Chay Suede and Isabelle Drummond

Volume 2 
Cover: Alice Wegmann and Humberto Carrão

Ratings 

The first episode of A Lei do Amor registered a viewership rating of 30 points in Greater São Paulo, the lowest viewership for the 8/9 pm telenovela premiere.

References

External links 
  
 

2016 telenovelas
Brazilian telenovelas
2016 Brazilian television series debuts
TV Globo telenovelas
2017 Brazilian television series endings
Portuguese-language telenovelas
Brazilian LGBT-related television shows